A pilot is a person who flies or navigates an aircraft.

Pilot or The Pilot may also refer to:

 Maritime pilot, a person who guides ships through hazardous waters
 Television pilot, a television episode used to sell a series to a television network
 Pilot experiment, a small-scale preliminary study conducted prior to a full-scale research project

Arts and entertainment

Fictional characters
 Pilot (Farscape), a member of a race known as Pilots 
 Jennifer "Pilot" Chase, a character in the Canadian-American science fiction-action television series Captain Power and the Soldiers of the Future

Film and television

 Pilots (film), a 2000 Malayalam film
 The Pilot (film), a 1980 film
 "The Pilot" (Doctor Who), an episode of the 10th series
 "The Pilot" (Seinfeld), the finale of the 4th season
 The Pilot. A Battle for Survival, a 2021 Russian film

Literature
 "Pilot" (short story), by Stephen Baxter, 1993
 Pilot (British magazine), a general aviation magazine
 The Pilot (Massachusetts newspaper), the official newspaper of the Roman Catholic Archdiocese of Boston, U.S.
 The Pilot (North Carolina newspaper), a semiweekly newspaper
 The Pilot News, a newspaper serving Plymouth, Indiana, U.S.
 The Virginian-Pilot, the daily newspaper of Norfolk, Virginia, U.S.
 The Pilot (Dublin newspaper), published 1830s–1840s by Eaton Stannard Barrett's brother Richard
 The Pilot, a 1976 novel by Robert P. Davis
 The Pilot: A Tale of the Sea, an 1824 novel by James Fenimore Cooper

Music

Bands
 Pilot (band), a Scottish rock group
 Pilot (Russian band), a Russian rock band

EPs
 Pilot (Mallory Knox EP), 2011
 Pilot (Reuben EP), 2001
 Pilot, a 2014 EP by Amber Run

Songs
 "Pilot" (50 Cent song), 2014
 "Pilot", a song by Blue Cheer from the 1970 album The Original Human Being
 "Pilot", a song by The Notwist from the 2002 album Neon Golden
 "Pilots" (song), by Goldfrapp, 2001
 "The Pilot", a 1976 song by England Dan & John Ford Coley from I Hear Music
 "The Pilot" (Double Experience song), 2017

Businesses and organizations 
 Pilot (educational organization), teaching practical skills in computer science and entrepreneurship
 Pilot (pen company), a Japanese pen manufacturer
 Pilot (studio), a Russian animation studio
 Pilot Flying J, a North American chain of truck stops 
 Pilot Software, an American business intelligence vendor

People
 Pilot (surname), including a list of people with the name
 Pilot Baba (born 1938), an Indian spiritual guru and former fighter pilot

Places
 Pilot, Davidson County, North Carolina, U.S.
 Pilot, Franklin County, North Carolina, U.S.
 Pilot, Virginia, U.S.
 Pilot (župa), a county of Serbia in the Middle Ages
 Pilot Glacier, Victoria Land, Antarctica
 Pilot Island, in Lake Michigan, Wisconsin, U.S.
 Pilot Mountain (disambiguation)
 Pilot Township (disambiguation)

Science and technology
 PILOT, a high-level programming language developed in the 1960s
 Pilot (operating system), designed by Xerox PARC in the 1970s

Sports
 Portland Pilots, the nickname for athletics at the University of Portland, U.S.
 Seattle Pilots, a 1969 American baseball team that became the Milwaukee Brewers

Transportation

Automobiles
 Pilot (automobile), the name of three different automobiles of the early 1900s
 Ford Pilot, a 1947–1951 American-British mid-size car
 Honda Pilot, a 2003–present Japanese-American mid-size SUV
 LDV Pilot, a 1997–2006 British panel van
 MG Pilot, a 2020–present British-Chinese compact SUV

Ships
 Pilot (1813 ship), a convict transport to Australia
 Pilot (boat), a pilot boat and museum ship in San Diego, California, U.S.
 Pilot (icebreaker), the Russian icebreaker ship, converted in 1864
 , the name of several Royal Navy ships

Trains
 Pilot (locomotive), or cowcatcher, a device mounted at the front of a locomotive to deflect obstacles 
 Station pilot, a shunting engine based at a major passenger station

Other uses
 PILOT (finance), in public finance, a payment in lieu of taxes

See also
 
 
 
 
 Aviator (disambiguation)
 Driver (disambiguation)
 La Piloto, a 2017-2018 Spanish-language crime drama television series
 Pilate (disambiguation)
 Piloting (navigation) or pilotage, the act of navigating by visual landmarks over water or in the air
 Pilot fish (Naucrates ductor), a small fish
 Pilot job, a type of multilevel scheduling
 Pilot light, a flame kept continually burning and used to light burners on household appliances
 Pilot plant, a pre-commercial production system used to evaluate new technologies and designs
 Pilot signal, or pilot tone, in telecommunications
 Pilot whale, a whale-like dolphin
 Pilotman, a railway worker who ensures that only one train enters a single track rail segment at a time